Ling Gill is a gill (or narrow valley) in the Yorkshire Dales in North Yorkshire, England.  Cam Beck, a tributary of the River Ribble, flows through the gill.

Ling Gill is a rare example of a sub-alpine ash woodland.  The site is a Site of Special Scientific Interest and a national nature reserve, not open to the public.  The Pennine Way passes the east end of the gill.

References 

Sites of Special Scientific Interest in North Yorkshire
National nature reserves in England
Nature reserves in North Yorkshire
Ribblesdale